David Anthony Murphy (19 July 1917 – 19 September 1944) was an English professional footballer who played as a left-half in the Football League for Middlesbrough.

Personal life
Murphy served as a gunner in the Royal Artillery during the Second World War and was killed on 19 September 1944 during the advance from Ancona to Rimini in the Italian campaign. He is buried at the Gradara War Cemetery.

Career statistics

References

1917 births
1944 deaths
People from South Bank, Redcar and Cleveland
Footballers from Middlesbrough
Association football wing halves
English footballers
English Football League players
South Bank St Peters F.C. players
Middlesbrough F.C. players
Blackburn Rovers F.C. players
British Army personnel killed in World War II
Royal Artillery soldiers
Military personnel from Yorkshire